Garden City Shopping Centre may refer to:

 Garden City Shopping Centre (Winnipeg), a shopping centre in Winnipeg, Manitoba
 Westfield Booragoon, a shopping centre in Booragoon, Western Australia formerly named as Garden City
 Westfield Garden City, a shopping centre in Upper Mount Gravatt, Queensland
 Westfield Kotara, a shopping Center in Kotara, New South Wales which rebranded in 2003